Neanderthal is the second studio album by Danish electronic rock band Spleen United. It topped the Danish Albums Chart at #1.

Track listing
Disc I
Suburbia (4:27)	
My Tribe (3:57)	
Failure 1977 (4:17)	
Heat (6:47)	
Everybody Wants Revenge (4:07)	
Dominator (3:56)	
66 (5:35)	
High Rise (3:10)	
My Tribe Part II (2:34)	
Under the Sun (7:12)	
My Jungle Heart (5:54)

Disc II
(Live From MTV Spanking New Music Tour)
Suburbia (5:03)	
She Falls in Love with Machines		
Dominator		
My Jungle Heart (6:45)	
My Tribe (4:36)
	
My Tribe
6. My Tribe (Video) - Good Boy! Creative (4:11)	
7. My Tribe (Making The Video) – Carl Gustav Winther, Rie Neuchs (3:54)

Charts

References

2008 albums
Spleen United albums